Ian Rey Smith Quirós (born 6 March 1998) is a Costa Rican professional footballer who last played as a right-back for Liga FPD club Alajuelense and plays at the Costa Rica national team. 

In May 2018, he was named in Costa Rica's 23-man squad for the 2018 World Cup in Russia.

Career statistics

International

Honours
Alajuelense
 Liga FPD: Apertura 2020
 CONCACAF League: 2020

References

External links

1998 births
Living people
Costa Rican footballers
Costa Rica international footballers
Association football defenders
IFK Norrköping players
Costa Rican expatriate footballers
Expatriate footballers in Sweden
Costa Rican expatriate sportspeople in Sweden
People from Limón Province
2018 FIFA World Cup players
Santos de Guápiles footballers
Hammarby Fotboll players
Allsvenskan players
Liga FPD players
L.D. Alajuelense footballers